Yudino is a rural locality (a selo) and the administrative center of Yudinskoye Rural Settlement, Podgorensky District, Voronezh Oblast, Russia. The population was 488 as of 2010. There are 9 streets.

Geography 
Yudino is located 36 km north of Podgorensky (the district's administrative centre) by road. Kostomarovo is the nearest rural locality.

References 

Rural localities in Podgorensky District